The Port Harcourt Electricity Distribution Company (PHED) is a private electric distributor that provides power for a total of 14 million people in 4 states of Nigeria including Rivers, Bayelsa, Cross River and Akwa Ibom. It first operated as a government-owned enterprise before being privatized in 2013. Presently, PHED is owned by 4 Power Consortium Ltd. The headquarters are located at 1 Moscow Road in Old GRA, Rivers State.

On September 1 2020, PHED announced a new electricity tariff for customers in Akwa Ibom, Bayelsa, Cross River and Rivers states.

See also

Omega Butler Refinery

References

External links

Companies based in Port Harcourt
Energy in Rivers State
Privately held companies of Nigeria
Electric power companies of Nigeria
Old GRA, Port Harcourt